Guthrie Zhokinyi (born 8 May 1985) is a retired Zimbabwean football defender.

References

1985 births
Living people
Zimbabwean footballers
Shooting Stars F.C. (Zimbabwe) players
Dynamos F.C. players
Triangle United F.C. players
Zimbabwe international footballers
Association football defenders
Zimbabwe Premier Soccer League players
2011 African Nations Championship players
Zimbabwe A' international footballers